Seat belt legislation in Canada is left to the provinces.  All provinces in Canada have primary enforcement seat belt laws, which allow a police officer to stop and ticket a driver if they observed a violation. Ontario was the first province to pass a law which required vehicle occupants to wear seat belts, a law that came into effect on January 1, 1976.

The laws by province
This table contains a brief summary of all seatbelt laws in Canada. This list includes only seatbelt laws, which often do not themselves apply to children; however, all provinces and territories have separate child restraint laws. A subsequent offense may be higher.

See also
Seat belt legislation
Seat belt legislation in the United States
Seat belt use rates by country

References

Automotive safety
Vehicle law
Seat belts